Baruch Jacob Placzek (1 October 1834 – 17 September 1922), also known by the pen name Benno Planek, was a Moravian rabbi, author, poet, orator, and naturalist. He was the last Landesrabbiner of Moravia, which position he held from 1884 until his death. As a writer, he published numerous sermons, speeches, and obituaries, as well as scientific, lyrical, and narrative works.

Biography

Early life and education
Baruch Jacob Placzek was born in Weisskirchen (now Hranice, Czech Republic) to Anna and Abraham Placzek, Landesrabbiner of Moravia. He was taught Talmud by his father in Boskowitz, and educated at the gymnasia of Nikolsburg and Brünn. He then attended the Universities of Vienna and Leipzig, where he completed a PhD under the supervision of Wilhelm Wachsmuth in November 1856, with a dissertation on the cultural history of the indigenous peoples of Mexico.

Career
In 1861 he became Chief Rabbi of Brünn (Brno), a position he held for the next forty-four years. He meanwhile succeeded his father as Landesrabbiner of Moravia in 1884, in which role he was an adherent of moderate religious reform. He promoted the foundation of the  seminary in Vienna, for which he served as curator, and was a founder of a number of philanthropic societies.

In part under the pseudonym Benno Planek, he besides published the collections of poetry Im Eruw (1867) and Stimmungsbilder (1872), the novel Der Takif (1895), and other works, several of which were translated into English, French, and Hebrew. As a naturalist, he gave natural science lectures at the Natural History Society of Brünn, and contributed to the journals  and The Popular Science Monthly. He was a close friend of Gregor Mendel, and corresponded with Charles Darwin, whose theory of evolution he promoted. In one article, Placzek attempted to show that the rabbis in the Talmud put forward ideas akin to Darwinism.

Placzek received an honorary doctorate from the University of Leipzig in 1907. He was a knight of the Order of Franz Joseph, and an honorary member of several political societies.

Death and legacy
Placzek died in 1922 at the age of 87, predeceased by his wife Caroline and son Oswald. He was survived by his children Sarah, Linda, Ida, Emma, Alfred, and Irma, at least two of whom died in the Theresienstadt Ghetto during the Holocaust. Among his grandchildren were the physicist George Placzek (1905–1955) and the architect and art historian  (1913–2000). His nephew Leo Baeck would go on to serve as President of the World Union for Progressive Judaism.

A bust of Placzek's likeness was unveiled in the entrance hall of the Brno Jewish Community Centre in 2012.

Selected publications

 
 
 
 
 
 
  
 
 
  
 
 
 
 
 
 
 
  Published in English as The Weasel and the Cat in Ancient Times (1887).

References
 

1834 births
1922 deaths
19th-century Czech novelists
19th-century Czech poets
19th-century male writers
19th-century naturalists
19th-century non-fiction writers
19th-century Austrian zoologists
20th-century Czech novelists
20th-century Czech poets
20th-century male writers
20th-century naturalists
20th-century non-fiction writers
20th-century Czech rabbis
20th-century Austrian zoologists
Bohemian writers
Chief rabbis of Moravia
Clergy from Brno
Czech Orthodox rabbis
Czech science writers
Czech writers in German
German-language poets
Jewish Czech writers
Jewish non-fiction writers
Jewish poets
Jewish religious writers
Jewish scientists
Knights of the Order of Franz Joseph
Leipzig University alumni
Male non-fiction writers
People from Hranice (Přerov District)
People from the Margraviate of Moravia
Sermon writers
University of Vienna alumni
Writers from Brno
19th-century pseudonymous writers
20th-century pseudonymous writers
19th-century Czech rabbis